Elizabeth Cup may refer to:

 Queen Elizabeth II Cup (Hong Kong), a horse race in Hong Kong, China
 Queen Elizabeth II Cup (Japan), a horse race in Kyoto, Japan; formerly held as the Queen Elizabeth II Commemorative Cup until 2012
 Queen Elizabeth II Challenge Cup Stakes, a horse race in Kentucky, USA
 Princess Elizabeth Challenge Cup, a rowing event for Eights at the Henley Royal Regatta in Henley, UK

See also 
 S. E. Cupp (S. Elizabeth Cupp)
 Elizabeth (disambiguation)
 Elizabeth Stakes (disambiguation)
 Queen's Cup (disambiguation)